Jaume Calucho (born 9 November 1927) is a Spanish cyclist who cycled professionally from 1952 to 1963. He made his professional debut with CC Barcelona in 1952. and most famously raced in the Vuelta a España, where he achieved a prominent result by finishing 38th in the general classification in 1955 and 1958.

Biography
Jaume Calucho was born in Lleida, Catalonia on November 9, 1927. His brother Joan Calucho Mestres was also a professional cyclist, he was known as Calucho II. In 1955 he signed for the Mariotas team and took part in the Cycling Tour of Catalonia. In 1957, with the Mobylette, he won the races in Almacelles, Bellver, Binèfar and Tarragona. His last season as a professional was 1958–59, signed by Ignis-Penya Solera, with whom he took part in the Vuelta a España. Already retired, he was curator and deputy director of the Tour of Lleida, which he went on to direct at the death of its historical organizer, Josep Simó. He was also a federal delegate in the lands of Lleida. On 1963, he announced his retirement from cycling at the end of season after an 11-year career.

Major results

1951
 5th Overall Gran Premio Cataluña
1954
 1st Circuit Ribera del Jalón
1955
 10th Trofeo Masferrer
1956
 9th Overall Volta a Catalunya
1957
 1st Almacelles
 1st Tarragona
 1st Bellvei
1958
 1st Bellcaire
 4th Overall Euskal Bizikleta

Vuelta a España results 
 1955: 38th
 1958: 38th

References

External links
 

1927 births
Living people
Spanish male cyclists
Sportspeople from Lleida
Cyclists from Catalonia
20th-century Spanish people